Provincial Trunk Highway 89 (PTH 89) is a provincial highway in the Canadian province of Manitoba. It runs from PTH 12 south to Piney and the U.S. border. South of the border it becomes Minnesota State Highway 89.

References

External links
Official Manitoba Highway Map

089